Paul Merton in India is a travel documentary broadcast on Five in 2008. It follows comedian Paul Merton as he travels around various places in the country, such as Delhi and the Punjab, sampling various offbeat and out of the normal aspects of India.

The series was commissioned after the success of the previous series Paul Merton in China.

It was broadcast on Fox History & Entertainment in India and on AXS TV in the USA.

References

External links

2008 British television series debuts
2008 British television series endings
Channel 5 (British TV channel) original programming
Television series by Endemol
British travel television series
Television shows set in India
Television series by Tiger Aspect Productions